Road Kill is the debut studio album by Australian dance musician Groove Terminator. It was released in February 2000 and peaked at number 39 on the ARIA Charts.

At the ARIA Music Awards of 2000, the album was nominated for ARIA Award for Best Male Artist and ARIA Award for Best Cover Art.

Reception
The Age said "Roadkill mashed up punky guitar riffage, groove-laden hip-hop, pogoing choruses, rough breaks and anthemic big-beat."

Track listing 
 "What's Your Name?" - 4:21
 "One More Time (The Sunshine Song)" - 4:07
 "Who's Gonna Take the Weight?" - 3:20
 "Yo Baby" - 4:16
 "You Can't See" (featuring Kool Keith) - 6:37
 "The Human Beatbox" - 4:24
 "Here Comes Another One" (featuring Basshoppa) - 3:30
 "I've Got It in for You" - 8:02
 "Notorious" - Duran Duran cover - 4:53
 "Not Everything" (featuring Cameron Baines)- 3:41
 "Losing Ground" (featuring Zena) (F.I.S.T. remix) - 7:19

Charts

References

2000 debut albums
Virgin Records albums